Szczecin Gumieńce is a railway station in the town of Gumieńce, West Pomeranian Voivodeship, Poland. The station lies on the Berlin-Szczecin railway and Bützow–Szczecin railway.

References

Timetables for Szczecin Gumience station

External links

Gumieńce